Siro Maximiliano Darino (born September 1, 1976) is an Argentine professional football player.  He also holds Italian citizenship.

Career
Born in San Carlos de Bolívar, Darino began playing football with Gimnasia y Esgrima de La Plata. He made his Argentine Primera División debut as a substitute against Unión de Santa Fe on 9 August 1998. After suffering a series of injuries, he was released by Gimnasia in June 2000.

Darino moved to Spain to join Segunda División side Getafe CF later in 2000. He made 36 league appearances as the club were relegated to the third-tier of Spanish football. The following season he played on loan in the Segunda División B with Hércules CF, appearing in 27 matches as the club failed to gain promotion.

In the summer of 2002, Darino contemplated a move to a club in Italy's Serie C but signed a one-year contract with Universidad de Las Palmas CF with an option to renew. He made several appearances for Universidad de Las Palmas in the Segunda B.

References

1976 births
Living people
Argentine footballers
Argentine expatriate footballers
Argentine people of Italian descent
Expatriate footballers in Spain
Argentine Primera División players
Club de Gimnasia y Esgrima La Plata footballers
Getafe CF footballers
Hércules CF players
Universidad de Las Palmas CF footballers
UD Las Palmas players
Segunda División players
Segunda División B players
Argentine expatriate sportspeople in Spain
Citizens of Italy through descent
Argentine emigrants to Italy
Association football midfielders
Sportspeople from Buenos Aires Province